Sangliana is a 1988 Indian Kannada-language action drama film directed, co-produced and written by P. Nanjundappa. It is loosely inspired by the life story of the cop-turned-politician H. T. Sangliana. The film stars Shankar Nag, Bhavya and Tara, with actor Ambareesh making a special appearance. The film was produced under Pushpagiri Films banner and the music was composed by Hamsalekha. A. R. Rahman had worked as an assistant in this movie.

A sequel of the film was made with the same cast and crew and was titled as S. P. Sangliyana Part 2 which released in 1990. After Shankar Nag's demise, a third installment titled Sangliyana Part-3 released in 1997 starring Devaraj (who was the antagonist of the film) - thereby becoming the second character-based trilogy in Kannada after CID 999.

Plot
Ram is a thug, who save some people from getting killed by Vikram, the son of MLA Nagappa and his henchmen, who wants to construct a powerplant. Impressed, Vikram appoints Ram as his henchmen. Ram meets Kanchana, the daughter of an investigating reporter named Mahesh, who is against Nagappa and Vikram's atrocities. Ram falls for Kanchana and pursues her to accept him, Though reluctant Kanchana reciprocates his love. Ram meets a young Avinash and his mentally disabled mother Lakshmi. Lakshmi's husband is a forest officer, who discovers that Vikram is actually involved in smuggling Sandalwood and tries to arrest them, but is killed by Vikram and his henchmen which makes Lakshmi lose her mental balance after witnessing her husband's death. Fed up by the atrocities committed by father-son duo (Vikram and Nagappa), The DGP appoints Inspector Sangliyana to gather evidence against the father-son duo and arrest them. Vikram arrives at Mahesh's printing press to warn him and attempts to break Kanchana's hand, but is stopped by Ram, who thrashes Vikram.

Enraged, Vikram places false charges against Ram and is brought to the station, where they learn that Ram is actually Sangliyana and the one who took Sangliyana's place is Inspector Amar as they planned a covert operation against Vikram and Nagappa. Sangliyana takes charge and closes gambling dens and other operations. Kalle Gowda, the Nagpatna constituency tries to bribe Sangliyana, but Sangliyana arrest Kalle Gowda in charges of his wife's death. Nagappa fakes Kalle Gowda's death to help him escape, but is thwarted by Sangliyana, who catches Kalle Gowda and takes him to prison. Lakshmi recovers and reunites with Avinash. Sangliyana arrest Vikram in pub overtime case and also request Mahesh to nominate for election. Mahesh accepts and wins the election against Nagappa. Nagappa tries to kill Mahesh, with the help of his second son (Vikram's brother) Kumbi, but is outsmarted by Sangliyana. Nagappa kidnaps Mahesh, Kanchana and Lakshmi. Sangliyana arrives, along with Amar and rescues them, but Lakshmi is killed in the process by Nagendra. Naagendra, Vikram and Kumbi are arrested where Sangliyana is appreciated by the DGP and is transferred to another city, where Sangliyana leaves, along with Kanchana and Avinash.

Cast 

 Shankar Nag as Ram/Sangliyana 
 Ambareesh as Inspector Amar
 Srinath as DGP in Sp. App.
 Bhavya as Kanchana, Mahesh's daughter
 Devaraj as Vikram aka Vikki
 Tara as Lakshmi, Forest officer's wife
 Master Manjunath as Avinash 
 Vajramuni as Nagappa 
 Doddanna as Kalle Gowda
 Lohithaswa as Mahesh, Kanchana's father
 Sudhir as Kumbi
 Gayatri Prabhakar as Kalle Gowda's wife
 Prathiba as call girl
 Ramesh Kamath as Forest officer
 Roger Narayan as Kumar
 Disco Shanti as Pub Dancer (item number)

Soundtrack 

The music was composed by Hamsalekha, with lyrics written by V. Manohar and Doddarangegowda. The album consists of four tracks.

References

External links 
 

1988 films
1980s Kannada-language films
Indian action drama films
Indian biographical drama films
Films scored by Hamsalekha
Fictional portrayals of the Karnataka Police
1980s action drama films
1980s biographical drama films
1988 drama films